Jakub Blažek (born 20 August 1989 in Plzeň) is a professional Czech football player who currently plays for Baník Sokolov  .

Career

Football 
Blažek played in his youth for FK Baník Sokolov, SK Buldoci Kalovy Vary (on loan from Banik Sokolov), FK Chmel Blšany, FC Viktoria Plzeň and 1. FC Karlovy Vary.

In the summer 2021, Blažek returned to Baník Sokolov.

Futsal 
He played since 2008 futsal in the summer and winter break for SK INDOSS Plzeň.

References

External links
 Jakub Blažek at Flashscore
 Jakub Blažek at Soccerway
 Jakub Blažek at Fotbalunas

Czech footballers
1989 births
Living people
Czech men's futsal players
FK Baník Sokolov players
FC Slavia Karlovy Vary players
FK Chmel Blšany players
FC Viktoria Plzeň players
TJ Jiskra Domažlice players
FK Králův Dvůr players
Czech National Football League players
Sportspeople from Plzeň
Association football midfielders
Association football defenders